Skyr is an Icelandic cultured dairy product originating in Norway. It has the consistency of strained yogurt, but a milder flavor. Skyr can be classified as a fresh sour milk cheese, similar to curd cheese consumed like a yogurt in the Baltic states, the Low Countries, Germany and  Russia. It has been a part of Icelandic cuisine for centuries. 

Skyr has a slightly sour dairy flavor, with a hint of residual sweetness. It is traditionally  served cold, either plain or with cream. Commercial manufacturers of skyr have added flavors such as vanilla, coffee, or fruit.

History 
A staple of Icelandic diet since the Viking age, Skyr is mentioned in a number of medieval Icelandic sources, including Egil's saga and Grettis saga. It has been suggested that skyr was known throughout Scandinavia at the time of the settlement of Iceland, but eventually forgotten outside Iceland.

The word skyr is related to the English word shear (to cut), referring to how the milk is  split into the liquid whey and the thick skyr.

Nutrition
Skyr is a high-protein, low-fat product made from low-fat milk, varying slightly between brands.  Unflavored skyr has roughly 13 g  protein, 4 g carbohydrates, and 0.2 g fat per 100 g.

Uses

Skyr is usually mixed with sugar and milk. A traditional Icelandic dish exists which consists of roughly equal amounts of skyr and porridge. Skyr is often mixed with jam or fruit for a dessert, with prepared fish for dinner, or with cereals for breakfast. Contemporary uses include using skyr as a cheesecake topping and as an ingredient in milkshake or fruit smoothies.

Production
A small portion of a previous batch of skyr is then added to the warm milk to introduce the essential culture (the active bacterial culture), and with the addition of rennet the milk starts to curdle. Then the product is strained through fabric to remove the liquid whey.

Bacteria such as Streptococcus thermophilus and Lactobacillus delbrueckii subsp. bulgaricus play an important role in the fermentation of skyr. They also play a major role in the production of yogurt, but the yeast which is active in the low temperature step ensures that the product becomes a skyr and not a yogurt.

Commerce 
Skyr is commonly consumed in Iceland. Efforts at marketing it outside of Iceland began in 2005 when it was exported to the U.S. and sold at Whole Foods. Licensed production began the next year in Denmark and Scotland. Mjólkursamsalan (the major dairy cooperative in Iceland) and its associates registered "skyr" as a trademark in some countries, but this was later ruled to be invalid, as "skyr"  was found to be a generic term like "milk".

The commercial distribution of skyr outside of Iceland increased in the 2010s, with marketing as a low-sugar, no-fat, high-protein product consumed as a snack. In 2012, 80% of exported Icelandic skyr went to Finland and 20% to the U.S. Numerous skyr parlors were opened in Finland in 2019.

See also
 Filmjölk – another Nordic cultured milk product
 Viili - a cultured milk product from Finland

References

Fermented dairy products
Icelandic cuisine